From becoming queen on 6 February 1952, Elizabeth II was head of state of 32 independent states; at the time of her death, there were 15 states, called Commonwealth realms. Within the Westminster system in each realm, the Queen's government was headed by a prime minister. Appointment and dismissal of prime ministers were common reserve powers that could be exercised by Elizabeth or her governors-general.

Elizabeth had 179 individuals serve as her realms' prime ministers throughout her reign, the first new appointment being Dudley Senanayake as Prime Minister of Ceylon and the final being Liz Truss as Prime Minister of the United Kingdom, whom she appointed only two days before her death; some of these individuals served multiple non-consecutive terms in office (within the same state) as prime minister. Several of her prime ministers from various realms were appointed for life to the Privy Council of the United Kingdom.

This list does not cover Commonwealth nations that are not, or have not been, Commonwealth realms, nor holders of offices of prime minister in colonies or sub-national entities such as states or provinces.

List of prime ministers

Antigua and Barbuda

Antigua and Barbuda became independent on 1 November 1981 with Vere Bird as the first prime minister. Bird had previously been Premier of Antigua.

Reference

Australia

Robert Menzies was the incumbent prime minister when Elizabeth became queen.

Reference

The Bahamas

The Bahamas became independent on 10 July 1973 with Lynden Pindling as the first prime minister. Pindling had previously been the prime minister of the self-governing Commonwealth of the Bahama Islands.

Reference

Barbados

Barbados became independent on 30 November 1966 with Errol Barrow as the first prime minister. Barrow had previously been Premier of Barbados.

Reference

Barbados abolished the monarchy on 30 November 2021. Mottley remained in office as the republic's first prime minister.

Belize

Belize became independent on 21 September 1981 with George Cadle Price as the first prime minister. Price had previously been Premier of Belize.

Reference

Canada

Louis St. Laurent was the incumbent prime minister when Elizabeth became queen.

Reference

Ceylon

D. S. Senanayake was the incumbent prime minister of Ceylon when Elizabeth became queen.

Reference

Ceylon abolished the monarchy on 22 May 1972 and became the Democratic Socialist Republic of Sri Lanka. Bandaranaike remained in office as the republic's first prime minister until 23 July 1977.

Fiji

Fiji became independent on 10 October 1970 with Kamisese Mara as the first prime minister. Mara had previously been Chief Minister of Fiji.

Reference

Following the 1987 Fijian coups d'état (which resulted in a vacancy in the premiership until December 1987), on 7 October 1987, the new ruling regime declared the nation to have become the Republic of Fiji. Fiji's relationship with the monarchy after this transition is complex (see Monarchy of Fiji).

Gambia

The Gambia became independent on 18 February 1965 with Dawda Jawara as the first prime minister. Jawara had previously been prime minister of the self-governing Gambia.

Reference

The Gambia abolished the monarchy on 24 April 1970, via referendum. Jawara became President of the Gambia on the same day as the post of prime minister was abolished.

Ghana

Ghana became independent on 15 August 1957, with Kwame Nkrumah as its first prime minister. Nkrumah had previously been prime minister of the self-governing Gold Coast.

Reference

Ghana abolished the monarchy on 1 July 1960, via referendum. Nkrumah became President of Ghana on the same day as the post of prime minister was abolished.

Grenada

Grenada became independent on 7 February 1974 with Eric Gairy as the first prime minister. Gairy had previously been Premier of Grenada.

Reference

Guyana

Guyana became independent on 26 May 1966, with Forbes Burnham as its first prime minister. Burnham had previously been Premier of British Guiana.

Reference

Guyana abolished the monarchy on 23 February 1970. Burnham remained in office as the republic's first prime minister until 6 October 1980.

Jamaica

Jamaica became independent on 6 August 1962 with Alexander Bustamante as the first prime minister. Bustamante had previously been Premier of Jamaica.

Reference

Kenya

Kenya became independent on 12 December 1963, with Jomo Kenyatta becoming the first prime minister. Kenyatta had previously been prime minister of self-governing Kenya.

Reference

Kenya abolished the monarchy on 12 December 1964. Kenyatta became President of Kenya as the post of prime minister was abolished.

Malawi

Malawi became independent on 6 July 1964, with Hastings Banda as prime minister. Banda had previously been prime minister of self-governing Nyasaland.

Reference

Malawi abolished the monarchy on 6 July 1966. Banda became President of Malawi as the post of prime minister was abolished.

Malta

The Crown Colony of Malta became independent as the State of Malta on 21 September 1964 with George Borg Olivier as prime minister. Olivier had previously been the colony's prime minister.

Reference

Malta abolished the monarchy on 13 December 1974 and became the current Republic of Malta, a republic within the Commonwealth. Mintoff remained in office as the republic's first prime minister until 22 December 1984.

Mauritius

Mauritius became independent on 12 March 1968, with Seewoosagur Ramgoolam becoming the first prime minister. Ramgoolam had previously been Chief Minister of Mauritius.

Reference

Mauritius abolished the monarchy on 12 March 1992. Jugnauth remained in office as the republic's prime minister until 15 December 1995.

New Zealand

Sidney Holland was the incumbent prime minister when Elizabeth became queen.

Nigeria 

The Federation of Nigeria became independent on 1 October 1960, with Abubakar Tafawa Balewa becoming the first prime minister. Balewa had previously been Chief Minister of the Colony and Protectorate of Nigeria.

Reference

Nigeria became the Federal Republic of Nigeria on 1 October 1963. Balewa remained in office as the republic's prime minister until his overthrow and assassination in the 1966 Nigerian coup d'état on 15 January 1966.

Pakistan

Khawaja Nazimuddin was the incumbent prime minister when Elizabeth became queen.

Reference

Pakistan abolished the monarchy on 23 March 1956. Ali remained in office as the republic's first prime minister until 12 September 1956.

Papua New Guinea

Papua New Guinea became independent on 16 September 1975 with Michael Somare as the first prime minister. Somare had previously been Chief Minister of Papua New Guinea.

Reference

Saint Kitts and Nevis

Saint Kitts and Nevis became independent on 19 September 1983 with Kennedy Simmonds as the first prime minister. Simmonds had previously been Premier of Saint Kitts and Nevis.

Reference

Saint Lucia

Saint Lucia became independent on 22 February 1979 with John Compton as the first prime minister. Compton had previously been Premier of Saint Lucia.

Reference

Saint Vincent and the Grenadines

Saint Vincent and the Grenadines became independent on 27 October 1979 with Milton Cato as the first prime minister. Cato had previously been Premier of Saint Vincent.

Reference

Sierra Leone

Sierra Leone became independent on 27 April 1961, with Milton Margai as the first prime minister. Margai had previously been Prime Minister of the Protectorate of Sierra Leone.

Reference

Siaka Stevens assumed the role of prime minister following his party's narrow victory in the 1967 general election. However, immediately after taking office, Stevens was deposed by the National Reformation Council in a coup d'état and placed under house arrest. Military rule persisted until an April 1968 counter-coup restored Stevens' premiership.

Sierra Leone became the Republic of Sierra Leone on 19 April 1971. Stevens left the office of prime minister two days later and became President of Sierra Leone. The office of the prime minister was later abolished on 15 June 1978.

Solomon Islands

The Solomon Islands became independent on 7 July 1978 with Peter Kenilorea as the first prime minister.

Reference

South Africa

Daniel François Malan was the incumbent prime minister of the Union of South Africa when Elizabeth became queen.

Reference

Following a referendum, South Africa abolished the monarchy on 31 May 1961, becoming the Republic of South Africa. Verwoerd remained in office as the republic's first prime minister until 6 September 1966. The office of the prime minister was later abolished on 14 September 1984.

Tanganyika

Tanganyika became independent on 9 December 1961, with Julius Nyerere as its first prime minister. Nyerere had previously been the prime minister of self-governing Tanganyika.

Reference

Tanganyika abolished the monarchy on 9 December 1962. The post of prime minister was abolished.

Trinidad and Tobago

Trinidad and Tobago became independent on 31 August 1962, with Eric Williams as its first prime minister. Williams had previously been Chief Minister and Premier of Trinidad and Tobago.

Reference

Trinidad and Tobago abolished the monarchy on 1 August 1976. Williams remained in office as the republic's first prime minister until 29 March 1981.

Tuvalu

Tuvalu became independent on 1 October 1978 with Toaripi Lauti as the first prime minister. Lauti had previously been Chief Minister of Tuvalu.

Reference

Uganda

Uganda became independent on 9 October 1962 with Milton Obote as the first prime minister. Obote had previously been the prime minister of self-governing Uganda.

Reference

Uganda abolished the monarchy on 9 October 1963. Obote remained in office as the republic's first prime minister until 15 April 1966.

United Kingdom

Winston Churchill was the incumbent prime minister when Elizabeth became queen. 

Reference

Anomalous cases

Grenada (1979–1984) 
Maurice Bishop held de facto government control for most of the People's Revolutionary Government period (from 13 March 1979 until 14 October 1983). On 14 October 1983 Bishop was deposed by Bernard Coard and Bishop was killed on 19 October. Coard held power only briefly before military government was declared. After the invasion Grenada's pre-revolutionary system of government, and the office of Prime Minister, was restored on 4 December 1984. The website of the Grenadian government lists Bishop as a former prime minister, but not Coard nor any other individual who held de facto or de jure power in this period.

Rhodesia (1965–1970) 
Ian Smith was Prime Minister of Rhodesia following a unilateral declaration of independence on 11 November 1965. Though Rhodesia considered Elizabeth II as Queen of Rhodesia, this title was not accepted by her. Acting in his vice-regal capacity under direction from the UK government, Governor of Southern Rhodesia Humphrey Gibbs dismissed the prime minister and his government but this action was ignored by Smith. The state remained unrecognised by Britain and the international community. Following a referendum, Rhodesia declared itself a republic on 2 March 1970. Smith remained in office throughout this period.

See also
 Constitutional monarchy
 List of Commonwealth heads of government

Notes

  The occurrence of some anomalous cases means there is a small degree of ambiguity to this figure.
  After Christie suffered a stroke Cynthia A. Pratt served as acting Prime Minister from 4 May to 22 June 2005.
  Due to the Sandline affair, Chan resigned as Prime Minister on 27 March 1997 and Giheno took over as acting Prime Minister. He regained the position on 2 June 1997, shortly before being ousted in a general election.
  For two periods in this term of Somare's premiership Sam Abal was acting Prime Minister.
  See 2011–12 Papua New Guinean constitutional crisis for details on the dispute between Somare and O'Neill as to legitimately held the position of Prime Minister in this time. This period of ambiguity spans the time between the later-disputed dismissal of Somare from office and the implementation of the results of the 2012 general election.
  Tuilimu served as acting prime minister following the death of Ionatana.
  Telavi was removed from office on 1 August 2013. Sopoaga briefly served as Acting Prime Minister before being sworn in as Prime Minister on 5 August 2013
  A constitutional change ended Elizabeth II's reign in Uganda on 9 October 1963 though Uganda did not formally use the term "Republic" until 1966.

References

External links
 CIA list of world leaders (current and monthly historical archive: 2001–present)
 World Statesmen.org (directory of leaders)
 Rulers.org (directory of leaders)
 The queen and her 15 prime ministers

British Empire-related lists
Commonwealth of Nations
Commonwealth realms
Elizabeth II-related lists
Elizabeth II